Pterolophia albovitticollis is a species of beetle in the family Cerambycidae. It was described by Stephan von Breuning in 1961. It is known from Sumatra and Borneo.

References

albovitticollis
Beetles described in 1961